Ospedale is a station of the Brescia Metro, in the city of Brescia in northern Italy. The station is located in a densely populated area of the city, at the entrance to Spedali Civili di Brescia (Brescia General Hospital), which is the main destination for metro riders.

The reconstruction of the area around the station alleviated many parking problems as well as giving a complete overhaul to the roadways in front of the hospital and making things easier for pedestrians.

References

External links

Brescia Metro stations
Railway stations opened in 2013